Sveržov is a village and municipality in Bardejov District in the Prešov Region of north-east Slovakia.

History
In historical records the village was first mentioned in 1355

Geography
The municipality lies at an altitude of 345 metres and covers an area of 5.703 km2.
It has a population of about 510 people.

External links
 
 
http://www.statistics.sk/mosmis/eng/run.html

Villages and municipalities in Bardejov District
Šariš